Kilmaurs railway station is a railway station in the town of Kilmaurs, East Ayrshire, Scotland. The station is managed by ScotRail and is on the Glasgow South Western Line.

History 
The original Kilmaurs station was opened on 26 June 1873 by the Glasgow, Barrhead and Kilmarnock Joint Railway. The buildings on the Up platform (the platform for trains to Kilmarnock and the South) were destroyed by fire in 1914 and replaced by a brick building which, until its closure in 1966, was the only one in south west Scotland to be centrally heated. To the south of the station, a signal box containing 17 levers controlled the section and allowed access to a goods yard.

The station officially closed on 7 November 1966. The current station opened on 12 May 1984 by British Rail.

Platform extension work started in September 2009 to cater for longer units associated with the track doubling works between Stewarton and Lugton.

Being so close to Kilmarnock station the guards often failed to sell tickets to all passengers travelling to Kilmarnock. In 2012 a ticket machine was installed at the station.

Service

2019 service pattern 
Since the doubling of the line between Lugton and Stewarton in December 2009 the service pattern has been:

 Sundays - hourly each way served by trains between Glasgow Central and Kilmarnock, with a few extended south towards Dumfries and Carlisle.

Gallery

References

Notes

Sources 

 
 
 
 RAILSCOT on Glasgow, Barrhead and Kilmarnock Joint Railway

External links
 YouTube video of Kilmaurs railway station

Railway stations in East Ayrshire
Former Glasgow, Barrhead and Kilmarnock Joint Railway stations
Railway stations in Great Britain opened in 1873
Railway stations in Great Britain closed in 1966
Railway stations in Great Britain opened in 1984
Reopened railway stations in Great Britain
SPT railway stations
Railway stations served by ScotRail
Beeching closures in Scotland
1873 establishments in Scotland